Xezo is an American designer brand of luxury goods.
The brand produces luxury items, including Swiss-made timepieces, pens, eyewear, and leather goods.

Xezo technically operates as a private label brand. They design their watches and have them produced for them in Switzerland.

History
Xezo was founded in 2001.

Products
Xezo items are typically released in limited editions of 500 pieces or less per production. Typical materials used in the production of Xezo products include sterling silver, mother of pearl and sea shell, 18 karat gold, platinum, and chrome plating.

Several of Xezo's product designs are based on Art Deco and Art Nouveau styles.

Xezo produces ballpoint, rollerball, and fountain pens. Timepieces are produced with quartz movements or automatic mechanical movements. Leather products are handcrafted with Italian leather or vegetable-tanned leather. The eyewear series are produced with titanium frames.

References

External links
Xezo - About Us
worn&wound | Xezo Air Commando Hands On
Montre 24 Watch Portal

Watch brands
Fountain pen and ink manufacturers
American companies established in 2001
Manufacturing companies established in 2001